A numeral (often called number in Unicode) is a character that denotes a number. The decimal number digits  are used widely in various writing systems throughout the world, however the graphemes representing the decimal digits differ widely. Therefore Unicode includes 22 different sets of graphemes for the decimal digits, and also various decimal points, thousands separators, negative signs, etc. Unicode also includes several non-decimal numerals such as Aegean numerals, Roman numerals, counting rod numerals, Mayan numerals, Cuneiform numerals and ancient Greek numerals. There is also a large number of typographical variations of the Western Arabic numerals provided for specialized mathematical use and for compatibility with earlier character sets, such as ² or ②, and composite characters such as ½.

Numerals by numeric property
Grouped by their numerical property as used in a text, Unicode has four values for Numeric Type.  First there is the "not a number" type.  Then there are decimal-radix numbers, commonly used in Western style decimals (plain 0–9), there are numbers that are not part of a decimal system such as Roman numbers, and decimal numbers in typographic context, such as encircled numbers. Not noted is a numbering like "A. B. C." for chapter numbering.

Hexadecimal digits
Hexadecimal digits in Unicode are not separate characters; existing letters and numbers are used. These characters have marked Character properties Hex_digit=Yes, and ASCII_Hex_digit=Yes when appropriate.

Numerals by script

Hindu–Arabic numerals 
The Hindu–Arabic numeral system involves ten digits representing 0–9. Unicode includes the Western Arabic numerals in the Basic Latin (or ASCII derived) block. The digits are repeated in several other scripts: Eastern Arabic, Balinese, Bengali, Devanagari, Ethiopic, Gujarati, Gurmukhi, Telugu, Khmer, Lao, Limbu, Malayalam, Mongolian, Myanmar, New Tai Lue, Nko, Oriya, Telugu, Thai, Tibetan, Osmanya. Unicode includes a numeric value property for each digit to assist in collation and other text processing operations. However, there is no mapping between the various related digits.

Although Arabic is written from right to left, while English is written left to right, in both languages numbers are written with the most significant digit on the left and the least significant on the right.

Fractions 
The fraction slash character (U+2044) allows authors using Unicode to compose any arbitrary fraction along with the decimal digits. This was intended to instruct font rendering to make the surrounding digits smaller and raise them on the left and lower them on the right, but this is rarely implemented. (A workaround is to use the super/subscript characters described below, but only Arabic numerals are available.) Unicode also includes a handful of vulgar fractions as compatibility characters, but discourages their use.

Decimal fractions 
Several characters in Unicode can serve as a decimal separator depending on the locale. Decimal fractions are represented in text as a sequence of decimal digit numerals with a decimal separator separating the whole-number portion from the fractional portion. For example, the decimal fraction for ¼ is expressed as zero-point-two-five ("0.25"). Unicode has no dedicated general decimal separator but unifies the decimal separator function with other punctuation characters. So the "." used in "0.25" is the same period character (U+002E) used to end the sentence. However, cultures vary in the glyph or grapheme used for a decimal separator. So in some locales, the comma (U+002C) may be used instead: "0,25". Still other locales use a space (or non-breaking space) for "0 25". The Arabic writing system includes a dedicated character for a decimal separator that looks much like a comma "٫" (U+066B) which when combined with the Arabic digits to express one-quarter appears as: "٠٫٢٥".

Characters for mathematical constants  
Other mathematical constants can be represented using characters that have multiple semantic uses.

Rich text and other compatibility numerals 
The Western Arabic numerals also appear among the compatibility characters as rich text variant forms including bold, double-struck, monospace, sans-serif and sans-serif bold, along with fullwidth variants for legacy vertical text support.

Rich text parenthesized, circled and other variants are also included in the blocks Enclosed CJK Letters and Months; Enclosed Alphanumerics, Superscripts and Subscripts; Number Forms; and Dingbats.

Suzhou (huāmǎ/Sūzhōu mǎzi) numerals 

The huāmǎ/Sūzhōu mǎzi system is a variation of the rod numeral system. Rod numerals are closely related to the counting rods and the abacus, which is why the numeric symbols for 1, 2, 3, 6, 7 and 8 in the huāmǎ system are represented in a similar way as on the abacus. Nowadays, the huāmǎ system is only used for displaying prices in Chinese markets or on traditional handwritten invoices.

The digits of the Suzhou numerals are in the CJK Symbols and Punctuation block at U+3021—U+3029, U+3007, U+5341, U+5344, and U+5345. In Unicode 3.0 these characters are incorrectly called Hangzhou style numerals. In the Unicode 4.0, an erratum was added which stated:All references to "Hangzhou" in the Unicode standard have been corrected to "Suzhou" except for the character names themselves, which cannot be changed once assigned, according to the Unicode Stability Policy. (This policy allows software to use the names as unique identifiers.)

Japanese and Korean numerals

Ancient Greek numerals 
Unicode provides support for several variants of Greek numerals, assigned to the Supplementary Multilingual Plane from U+10140 through U+1018F.

Attic numerals were used by ancient Greeks, possibly from the 7th century BC.  They were also known as Herodianic numerals because they were first described in a 2nd-century manuscript by Herodian.  They are also known as acrophonic numerals because all of the symbols used derive from the first letters of the words that the symbols represent: 'one', 'five', 'ten', 'hundred', 'thousand' and 'ten thousand'.  See Greek numerals and acrophony.

Roman numerals 

Roman numerals originated in ancient Rome, adapted from Etruscan numerals.  The system used in classical antiquity was slightly modified in the Middle Ages to produce the system we use today. It is based on certain letters which are given values as numerals.

Roman numerals are commonly used today in numbered lists (in outline format), clockfaces, pages preceding the main body of a book, chord triads in music analysis (Roman numeral analysis), the numbering of movie and video game sequels, book publication dates, successive political leaders or children with identical names, and the numbering of some sport events, such as the Olympic Games or the Super Bowl.

Unicode has a number of characters specifically designated as Roman numerals, as part of the Number Forms range from U+2160 to U+2188. This range includes both upper- and lowercase numerals, as well as pre-combined characters for numbers up to 12 (Ⅻ or XII).  One reason for the existence of pre-combined numbers is to facilitate the setting of multiple-letter numbers (such as VIII) on a single horizontal line in Asian vertical text. The Unicode standard, however, includes special Roman numeral code points for compatibility only, stating that "[f]or most purposes, it is preferable to compose the Roman numerals from sequences of the appropriate Latin letters".

Additionally, characters exist for archaic forms of 1000, 5000, 10,000, large reversed C (Ɔ), late 6 (ↅ, similar to Greek Stigma: Ϛ), early 50 (ↆ, similar to down arrow ↓⫝⊥), 50,000, and 100,000.  The small reversed c, ↄ, is not intended to be used in Roman numerals, but as lower case Claudian letter Ↄ.

If using blackletter or script typefaces, Roman numerals are set in Roman type. Such typefaces may contain Roman numerals matching the style of the typeface in the Unicode range U+2160–217F; if they don't exist, a matching Antiqua typeface is used for Roman numerals.

Unicode has characters for Roman fractions in the Ancient Symbols block: sextans, uncia, semuncia, sextula, dimidia sextula, siliqua, and as.

Counting rod numerals

Counting rod numerals are included in their own block in the Supplementary Multilingual Plane (SMP) as of Unicode 5.0. There are nine "horizontal" digits (U+1D360 to U+1D368) and nine "vertical" digits (U+1D369 to U+1D371), the horizontal digits are used for odd powers of ten and the vertical digits for even powers of ten. Zero should be represented by U+3007 (〇, ideographic number zero) and the negative sign should be represented by U+20E5 (combining reverse solidus overlay). This block also contains other counting-rod-like symbols, such as the well-known tally mark for 5 . As these were recently added to the character set and are not in the BMP, font support may still be limited.

See also 
 Number Forms (Unicode block)

References 

Unicode
Numerals